Abdulkadir Emin Önen (born 15 March 1976) is a Turkish diplomat and the current Ambassador of Turkey to China. In addition to his native Turkish, he knows English and Chinese.

References 

Living people
1976 births
Ambassadors of Turkey to China